The Shijiazhuang–Taiyuan high-speed railway, or the Shitai passenger railway is a  high-speed railway operated by China Railway High-speed, running from Shijiazhuang to Taiyuan, respectively the provincial capitals of Hebei and Shanxi, at . The railway opened on April 1, 2009. It now forms part of the Qingdao–Yinchuan corridor.

History
 June 11, 2005: Construction of this line began.
 December 22, 2007: the -long Taihang Tunnel, was broken through.
 December 25, 2008: TISCO Bridge was completed, bringing the Shijiazhuang-Taiyuan PDL more than a week ahead of the scheduled construction time with all track laying completed.
 January 1, 2009: the official opening.
 February 18, 2009: EMU test car running.
 April 1, 2009: EMU put into formal operation.

Services
The Shijiazhuang–Taiyuan high-speed railway is used by G- and D-series high-speed trains. Initially, they mostly ran between Taiyuan and  Shijiazhuang. With the opening of the Beijing–Guangzhou high-speed railway, which runs through Shijiazhuang, in December 2012, almost all of these trains have been extended beyond Shijiazhuang; most of them now continue north to Beijing, while some go south, to Wuhan, Guangzhou, and other points along the line.

See also
 Shijiazhuang–Taiyuan Railway

References

High-speed railway lines in China
Railway lines opened in 2009
Rail transport in Hebei
Rail transport in Shanxi
Standard gauge railways in China
3
Shijiazhuang
Taiyuan